Solonceni is a commune in Rezina District, Moldova. It is composed of two villages, Solonceni and Tarasova.

In the 1990s, Solonceni operated a small trolleybus system using ZiU-9s hired from Moldova's capital city.

References

Communes of Rezina District